Susanna Freeborn (1674–1723) was a minister in the Religious Society of Friends (Quakers) in Providence, Rhode Island.  She travelled with Esther Palmer on Palmer's epic journey of 3,230 miles through eight colonies.

Life
Freeborn was born in Portsmouth, Rhode Island, in 1674 to Gideon Freeborn (1640-1720) and his wife Sarah (Brownell) Freeborn (1640-1676).

See also
 Ordination of women
 Susanna Freeborn and Esther Palmer, Journall of Susanna Freeborn and Esther Palmer from Rhoad Island to and from Pennsylvania, 28/8M/1704.  MS.  Box X 1/10.  Friends’ House Library, London.
 Quaker biographical sketches of ministers and elders, Philadelphia Yearly Meeting of the Society of Friends, 1972.
 Meredith Baldwin Weddle, Walking in the Way of Peace: Quaker Pacifism in the Seventeenth Century, Oxford University Press, 2001.
 Alan Taylor, Writing Early American History, University of Pennsylvania Press, 2006.
 H. M. Jenkins, Old Times in Nantucket, Friends Intelligencer, Society of Friends, volume 53, 1896, page 516.
 Christopher Coffin Hussey, Recollections of Nantucket — I, Friends' Intelligencer United with the Friends' Journal, vol 43, 1886.

References

English Quakers
Converts to Quakerism
People from Portsmouth, Rhode Island
1618 births
1668 deaths
17th-century Quakers
17th-century American women